Rupert McPherson Colmore Sr. (February 3, 1883 – July 9, 1958) was a college football player and physician. He succeeded William W. Dickey as director of the Venereal Clinics in Chattanooga. He married Margaret Bowdoin in Louisiana.

Early years

Colmore was born to Robert L. Colmore and Priscilla Addenbrook.

Sewanee
He was a member of Alpha Kappa Kappa. He was a prominent halfback and end for the Sewanee Tigers of Sewanee: The University of the South. He was captain of the 1904 team. Colmore was selected All-Southern by Nash Buckingham in 1903. Colmore was shifted from end to halfback in 1902, garnering praise for his play at both positions. George Trevor selected him as second-team end on his all-time Sewanee team.

Many of his brothers and also his son, Rupert Colmore Jr., played for Sewanee. His son is the only All-Southeastern Conference (SEC) player the school ever had.

References

1883 births
1958 deaths
Sewanee Tigers football players
All-Southern college football players
American football halfbacks
American football ends
Players of American football from Tennessee
People from Sewanee, Tennessee
People from Chattanooga, Tennessee